Daesung is a South Korean singer.

Daesung or Daeseong may also refer to:

Daesung Group, major South Korean industrial chaebol
Daesong Bank, North Korean bank
Dae-sung (name), Korean masculine given name

Geography
Taesong-guyok (Daeseong-guyeok), district of Pyongyang, North Korea
Daeseong-dong, village in Josan-ri, Gunnae-myeon, Paju, South Korea
Daeseong-ri Station, train station in Cheongpyeong-myeon, Gapyeong-gun, Gyeonggi-do, South Korea
Daeseongsan (disambiguation), any of the mountains by that name

See also
Daesong Market